"The Sparrows and the Nightingales" is the debut single by Wolfsheim. Written by Peter Heppner and Markus Reinhardt, it was featured on their album No Happy View.

Although the original release did not chart, the song has been covered by several artists, with the 1999 version by Mark 'Oh versus John Davies charting in the German Media Control charts for 14 weeks, peaking at number 14.

Wolfsheim single
The original Wolfsheim release of the song did not chart, but was a club hit and was widely available on various compilations.

Reinhardt says the lyric was inspired by The Great Gatsby by F. Scott Fitzgerald, "wegen der 'lautmalerischen Spannung' zwischen Raubtier und Geborgenheit gereizt." ("in the 'onomatopoeic tension' between predator and security.")

Track listing
The Sparrows and the Nightingales (6:45) / Leading Man (2:58) (12", Strange Ways MS-11071-02, 1991)
The Sparrows And The Nightingales (6:45) / Leading Men (2:58) / The Sparrows And The Nightingales (Radio Edit) (3:11) (CD, Strange Ways EFA-11071-03, 15 July 1991)

Mark 'Oh versus John Davies version

In 1999, Mark 'Oh versus John Davies covered the song for the album Rebirth. The single peaked at number 14 on the Media Control Charts, staying in the chart for 14 weeks.

Track listing

"The Sparrows and the Nightingales" (Short Mix) (3:15)
"The Sparrows and the Nightingales" (Long Mix) (5:11)
"The Sparrows and the Nightingales" (Oliver Lieb Main Mix) (6:27)
"The Sparrows and the Nightingales" (D.V. Remix) (6:02)
"The Sparrows and the Nightingales" (Oliver Lieb Club Mix) (6:27)

Other versions
German gothic metal band Scream Silence covered the song in 2000.

The electronic band The Echoing Green covered the song on the 2004 edition of their album The Winter of Our Discontent.

References

1991 debut singles
1999 singles
Wolfsheim (band) songs
1991 songs
Songs written by Peter Heppner